The Commission of Railway Safety is a government commission of India. Subordinate to the Ministry of Civil Aviation, the commission is the rail safety authority in India, as directed by The Railways Act, 1989.

The agency investigates serious rail accidents. Its head office is in the North-East Railway Compound in Lucknow. As of 2019, Shri Shailesh Kumar Pathak (IRSE:1986) is the Chief Commissioner of Railway Safety (CCRS).

Organisational structure and jurisdiction 
The Commission is headed by a Chief Commissioner of Railway Safety  (CCRS), at Lucknow, who also acts as Principal Technical Advisor to the Central Government in all matters pertaining to railway safety. Working under the administrative control of CCRS are 9 Commissioners of Railway Safety (CRS), each one exercising jurisdiction over one or more of the 17 Zonal Railways. In addition, Metro Railway (Kolkata), DMRC (Delhi), MRTS (Chennai) and Konkan Railway also fall under their jurisdiction. There are 5 deputy commissioners of railway safety posted in the headquarters at Lucknow for assisting the CCRS as and when required. In addition, there are 2 field deputy commissioners, one each in Mumbai and Kolkata, to assist the commissioners of railway safety in matters concerning the signalling and telecommunication disciplines.

See also
 Aircraft Accident Investigation Bureau – Indian air accident investigation agency

References

External links 
Shailesh Kumar Pathak appointed as the Chief Commissioner of Railway Safety
 Official website of The Commission of Railway Safety

Indian commissions and inquiries
Ministry of Railways (India)
Rail accident investigators
Railway safety
Government agencies established in 1961
1961 establishments in Uttar Pradesh
Organisations based in Uttar Pradesh